Commerce was launched at Liverpool in 1791. She was initially a West Indiaman. New owners in 1795 sent Commerce to the southern whale fishery in 1796. The Spanish captured her in 1797, but by 1799 she had returned to British ownership. She then traded generally until a French privateer captured her in 1805.

Career
Commerce first appeared in Lloyd's Register (LR) in 1791 with J.Conning, master, G. Slater, owner, and trade Liverpool–St Vincent.
After the outbreak of war with France in 1793, Captain William Bosworth acquired a letter of marque on 24 October 1794.

In 1795 ownership of Commerce changed to Bolton & Co., and her new owners employed her as a whaler, sending her to the Pacific. Captain Welham Clarke acquired a letter of marque on 17 June 1796. Captain Clarke sailed from London on 27 June 1796, bound for Chile. Commerce sailed for the Southern Fishery from Gravesend on 11 August 1796. On her way to the Pacific she stopped at Rio de Janeiro for water, refreshment, and calefaction.

Lloyd's List reported on 13 February 1798 that Commerce, Clark, master, was one of several British whalers that the Spanish had captured off the coasts of Chile and Peru. Spanish records have Commerce being taken at Pisco, Peru.

In a process that currently is obscure, Commerce had returned to British ownership by late 1798 or early 1799. She then traded in between Britain and North America, the West Indies, Portugal, and Ireland. Commerce had been sailing from Jamaica to Britain and Andromache believed Commerce would put into Fayal.

Fate
Lloyd's List reported on 5 April 1805 that Commerce, Whitaker, master, had been taken while sailing from Cork to London and taken into Calais, where she arrived before 26 March. Lloyd's Register for 1806 carried the annotation "capt." by her name. Her captor was the French privateer Glâneur.

Lloyd's Register

Notes

Citations

References
 
 
 
 

1791 ships
Age of Sail merchant ships of England
Whaling ships
Captured ships